Yazid Kaïssi (born 16 May 1981) is a French-Moroccan former professional footballer. He last played for Feignies Aulnoye.

Club career
A youth prospect of Lens, Kaïssi played for the reserve team and was a finalist in the 2000–01 Championnat National 2. He also played on loan for ES Wasquehal in Ligue 2 during the 2001–02 season.

Kaïssi never made an official appearance for the Lens first team, and he therefore left the club in October 2004 to play one season at Greek club Panionios, making only a few appearances. After his stint in Greece, he played one season at BK Häcken in Sweden. He then moved to Qatari club Umm-Salal. After stints with Al-Karamah and Dubai Club, Kaïssi signed with Moroccan club Wydad de Fès in the summer of 2011. In the 2012–13 season, he played for Stade Marocain. Kaïssi played for Feignies Aulnoye between 2013 and 2016.

International career
In 2002, Kaïssi was a member of the Algerian Under-23 National Team at the 2002 Palestine Solidarity Tournament in Yemen.

However, after that he opted to play for Morocco national football team and played for the senior national team at the 2002 Arab Nations Cup in Kuwait, appearing in three matches and scoring one goal.

Kaïssi was part of the 2004 Olympic Morocco national football team, which exited in the first round, finishing third in group D, behind group winners Iraq and runners-up Costa Rica.

References

External links
 
 
 
 
 
 
 

1981 births
Living people
Moroccan footballers
Morocco international footballers
RC Lens players
BK Häcken players
Al-Karamah players
Panionios F.C. players
Olympic footballers of Morocco
Footballers at the 2004 Summer Olympics
Moroccan expatriate footballers
Expatriate footballers in Greece
Expatriate footballers in Syria
Expatriate footballers in Sweden
Expatriate footballers in Qatar
Expatriate footballers in the United Arab Emirates
Umm Salal SC players
Dubai CSC players
Algeria under-23 international footballers
Algerian footballers
Sportspeople from Montreuil, Seine-Saint-Denis
Algerian people of Moroccan descent
Association football midfielders
Allsvenskan players
UAE First Division League players
UAE Pro League players
Qatar Stars League players
Syrian Premier League players
Wasquehal Football players
Wydad de Fès players
21st-century Algerian people
Footballers from Seine-Saint-Denis